Patapsco Female Institute (PFI) is a former girls' boarding school, now a partially rebuilt historical site, located on Church Road in Ellicott City, Maryland, United States.  The grounds are home to popular outdoor theatrical performances by The Chesapeake Shakespeare Company. In the 1930s the Institute was also known as "Warwick".

History

Phelps era 
The Patapsco Female Institute was chartered in January 1834. It was designed by architect Robert Cary Long Jr. and built by Charles Timanus, who also built the Court House. It opened on January 1, 1837 as a girls' finishing school but was more designed under Almira Hart Lincoln Phelps to enable young ladies to be trained well enough to support themselves through teaching; the school remained in operation until 1891. Students at the school ranged from age 12 to 18, and at its peak enrollment there were 150 students attending the institute.

Ellicott Mills (now Ellicott City) had both a boys' school, Rock Hill, and a girls' school, the Patapsco Female Institute (PFI). By 1840, neither was doing well. The Protestant Episcopal Bishop of Maryland, William R. Whittingham, had a personal interest in education and became involved in both schools. The Rev. Alfred Holmead transferred from Baltimore County to run Rock Hill and Bishop Whittingham, personally interviewed Almira Hart Lincoln Phelps to become the principal of the PFI. The Phelpses leased the school for seven years. John Phelps was listed as head of the family; in practice he was the business manager, taking care of the accounts, the grounds and buildings.

Under Almira Hart Lincoln Phelps, each student was charged a basic fee for room, board, washing, and basic instruction in English. Extra fees were charged for other subjects such as foreign languages, music and dance. The school eventually had several sources of income, including proceeds from state approved lotteries and $800 per annum for the admittance of lower income students who were to be trained as teachers. Maryland law stipulated that once the PFI had earned $15,000 from the lottery, the $800 annual state payment would cease. That happened in 1860.

Each academic year was composed of two 22 week sessions beginning in May and November. Diplomas were conferred in April and October. Typically, 5 or 6 girls earned diplomas during each period. Certificates were also issued for completion of a particular subject, such as English.

Almira Hart Lincoln Phelps was very active in helping to find employment opportunities for students who were interested. Almira Hart Lincoln Phelps managed to find positions for some girls to live at a large house and teach a handful of girls. Sometimes, after being away gaining teaching experience and earning some money, a girl would return to the PFI to finish her education. Almira Hart Lincoln Phelps also had some teaching positions with a high turn over, where ex-students could have some teaching experience before moving on to seek employment elsewhere.

Under Almira Hart Lincoln Phelps, when the school was not in session, and students had to remain, there was no organized activity for them. Almira Hart Lincoln Phelps always left town to visit relatives, her publishers or other personal business. John Phelps remained to keep the school open. He also arranged for the buildings to be cleaned and repaired.

A condition of Almira Hart Lincoln Phelps employment as principal of PFI was that she had to have an Episcopal priest on staff as chaplain. The Rev. Holmead was the first chaplain. In 1845, Almira Hart Lincoln Phelps replaced the Rev. Holmead and during her tenure there were a series of chaplains that she selected. After Almira Hart Lincoln Phelps left in 1856 the chaplains at PFI were usually the rectors of the local Episcopal Church, St Peter’s.

The Phelpses signed a second seven year lease in 1848. John Phelps died in 1849. In 1855 Almira Hart Lincoln Phelps decided not to renew her lease for a third time. She stayed on for an extra year so that the school could be expanded and would be large enough to accommodate the students from the school run in Baltimore by her replacement, Robert Harris Archer.

Archer era 
Robert Harris Archer (1812 - 1875) was a native of Harford County, Maryland. He was a graduate of West Point and resigned from the army in late 1837. In the 1840s he started a girls' school in Baltimore. He ran girls' schools the rest of his life. This Robert H. Archer is sometimes confused with his first cousin, Robert H. Archer (1820 - 1878). The other Robert H. Archer was the brother of Confederate general James Jay Archer and served in the Confederate Army, mostly on his brother’s staff.

The PFI under Robert H. Archer was different from the school run by Almira Hart Lincoln Phelps. The school was larger, the fees were higher, the girls had more freedom of movement, and more students stayed at the school when classes were not in session. Mr. Archer had programs year round for the girls. He was observed, for example, in July, 1857, with some of the girls at one of the spas in what was then western Virginia. The demographics of the student body were different.  When Almira Hart Lincoln Phelps came to PFI she brought students with her from the Rahway school. Some had also attended the West Chester school. Many girls came from states north of Maryland. Besides the students she brought with her, the PFI’s existing student body was primarily from Maryland and Virginia. Mr. Archer through his family had southern connections. There was a much greater deep south representation in Mr. Archer’s student body in his school in Baltimore, which would continue at the PFI. With greater freedom of movement, staying at school year round, present for more years, 21, from 1856 -1877, Mr. Archer’s student body made a larger impression on the local community than Almira Hart Lincoln Phelps’s students.

The Civil War was hard on the PFI and Mr. Archer’s finances. In an 1866 letter to a former student he wrote that the war almost ruined him and that he had $30,000 in outstanding pre-war debt due from the parents of students from the former Confederacy.  The riots in Baltimore in the spring of 1861, due to the passage of Union regiments through Baltimore on their way to Washington, caused the school to be closed for a time. In the fall of 1862, the 12th New Jersey Regiment camped near the school, and the PFI closed again. According to the chaplain of the PFI, at the time, Charles S. Spencer, the school re-opened in the spring of 1863.

Archer’s first wife, and first cousin, Elizabeth Archer died in 1852. He married his second wife Mary Ringgold Archer (d. 1892) in 1858.  By 1871 Archer was too ill to run the school.  On July 10, 1871, the PFI board voted to transfer the balance of the third seven year lease to Archer’s wife, Mary Ringgold Archer. Mrs. Archer ran the school, along with Roberta Archer, Robert Archer’s daughter from his first marriage until the third lease expired in 1877. Mary and Roberta Archer transferred their school to Washington, D. C. The school was named the Archer Institute.

End of the school 
The PFI remained closed for a year as the board spent $10,000 on improvements in the physical plant. The PFI reopened in the fall of 1879. The school was run by Sarah N. Randolph (1839 - 1892). After her seven year lease expired in 1885, Sarah Randolph moved to Baltimore and ran a school there.

A September, 1885, advertisement for the PFI, shows that the school was open with Annie Matchett as Principal and Roberta Archer as Vice Principal. The two women were let out of their lease. Amanda Taylor became Principal as early as the 1886 - 1887 academic year. She could not make ends meet and the school closed. In 1891, the joint stock company was dissolved and the property was sold to James E. Tyson.

Later history 
The property was converted to a summer hotel called the Burg Alnwick Hotel. Fourteen years later, in 1905, it was purchased by a Miss Lilly Tyson and turned into a private home. In 1917, during the First World War, the building was called into service as a hospital. It was fitted with 50 beds to accommodate wounded veterans returning to the States. In later years, the building was used as a theater and again as a private residence. In 1938, the Howard County School board considered the site for a new school. The guests of the Burg Alnick Hotel used the grounds for shooting clay pigeons. In 1958, the property was sold to the final resident, Dr. Whisman for use as a nursing home. Howard county made a demand of the owner to remove all wood from the structure to prevent fires, including the roof, floors and paneling leaving the institute in a permanent state of ruins. The property was willed to Dr. Whisman's Alma-mater, the University of Cincinnati.

In 1966, the County considered buying the eight acre property again as parkland from the University of Cincinnati using a news transfer tax for school and park projects. It was purchased for $17,500 by the County soon after. Since 1966 the building has been under the care of the 'Friends of the Patapsco Institute'; it has been stabilized and partially restored, and the grounds fenced in to limit public access. The county finance director declared the building unrestorable, but budgeted $1.7 million to convert the area around it to a park.

The Patapsco Female Institute is rumored to be haunted by the ghost of a young woman named Annie Van Derlot who died of pneumonia while attending school there. While this claim is popular among ghost hunters, there is no record of an Annie Van Derlot ever attending the Institute.

See also
List of Howard County properties in the Maryland Historical Trust
Description(s) and stories relating to various historical sites in Howard County MD.

References

External links
Patapsco Female Institute, EllicottCity.net
HMDB, Patapsco Female Institute: Classes and Camps
NRHP nomination form
Ghostly images, spirited debate, Baltimore Sun, Oct. 31, 2001
The Ghost Of The PFI
Patapsco Female Institute (PFI), 19 Aug 2006, Eastghost.com
Haunted Ruins
Patapsco Female Institute Virtual Tour at Capital Sky Eye Photography

Howard County, Maryland landmarks
School buildings completed in 1837
Buildings and structures in Ellicott City, Maryland
Tourist attractions in Howard County, Maryland
Historic district contributing properties in Maryland
History of women in Maryland
Educational institutions established in 1837
Educational institutions disestablished in 1891
1837 establishments in Maryland
1891 disestablishments in Maryland
National Register of Historic Places in Howard County, Maryland
University and college buildings on the National Register of Historic Places in New Jersey